Beene is a surname. Notable people with the surname include:

 Andy Beene (born 1956), baseball player
 Fred Beene (born 1942), baseball player
 Gene Beene, stunt performer
 Geoffrey Beene (1924–2004), fashion designer

See also
 Been (disambiguation)
 Oliver Beene, television show